This is a list of investment banks and stock brokerage firms in Uganda They are regulated by both the Capital Markets Authority and the Uganda Securities Exchange.

 African Alliance Investment Bank
 Baroda Capital Markets Uganda Limited
 Crested Capital Limited
 Dyer & Blair Investment Bank
 Equity Stock Brokers Uganda Limited
 UAP Old Mutual Financial Services Limited
 CfC Stanbic Financial Services Uganda Limited
 Baraka Capital Uganda Limited
 Rock Financial Services Limited
 SBG Securities Limited

See also
Banking in Uganda
List of banks in Uganda

References

External links
  Website of Uganda Securities Exchange
 Website of Uganda Capital Markets Authority

 
Investment banks
Uganda, investment
Investment banks
Uganda